Football at the 2013 Asian Youth Games was held from 13 August 2013 to 23 August 2013. Age limit for the teams was under-14. South Korea beat Iran 1–0 by a second half penalty to defend the 2009 gold medal, North Korea beat Iraq on penalties to win the bronze medal.

Medalists

Results

Preliminary round

Group A

Group B

Group C

Group D

Knockout round

Quarterfinals

Semifinals

Bronze medal match

Gold medal match

Goalscorers

References

External links
Official site 

Football
2013 in Asian football
2013 in Chinese football
2013